The Flintstones: The Rescue of Dino & Hoppy is a 1991 platform video game by Taito for the Nintendo Entertainment System and based on the animated series The Flintstones. Taito would later release another Flintstones game for the NES titled The Flintstones: Surprise at Dinosaur Peak in 1994.

Gameplay 
The gameplay is preceded by a short cutscene which sets the stage, where the Flintstones and the Rubbles are enjoying their lives in Bedrock. That's when a man from the 30th century named Dr. Butler kidnaps Fred's pet Dino and Barney's pet Hoppy. Fred's alien friend, Gazoo, lost parts of his time machine due to Dr. Butler. Gazoo is visible only to Fred and to nobody else (a slight change from the series where Barney, Pebbles and Bamm-Bamm could also see him).

With each stage Fred completes, he earns back another piece of the time machine, and Gazoo welds together the pieces progressively. Throughout the stages, Fred runs into Wilma, Barney, Betty, as well as George Jetson in the future stage. Fred has to defeat a boss at each stage. At the end of the map, he gets the last piece and travels to the future, where he has to defeat Dr. Butler.

Reception 
GamePro praised the graphics, gameplay, and the abundance of levels, but criticized the music. AllGame gave a review score of 4 out of 5 stars praising the game as a first rate platform with bright colorful graphics that mimic the cartoon series stating “Fred is easy to control, and his ability to club enemies and climb ledges goes a long way towards making the gameplay feel different from other titles in the genre.”

Legacy 

The video game is infamous for a ROM hack of the game titled 7 GRAND DAD. Released in 1992 and published by J.Y. Company in Taiwan, the game featured Fred Flintstone's head being swapped with Mario's head from Super Mario Bros. 3, and an altered title screen featuring a sprite of Mario originating from a bootleg Taiwanese gambling video game called Dian Shi Ma Li alongside a sprite of Fred Flintstone in a star originating from the unhacked game's title screen. This would eventually become an Internet meme, becoming famous after a live stream by Twitch streamer and YouTuber Vargskelethor Joel of the streaming group Vinesauce, as well as becoming a running joke on the parody music YouTube channel SiIvaGunner.

References 

1991 video games
Nintendo Entertainment System games
Nintendo Entertainment System-only games
Platform games
Taito games
Video games based on The Flintstones
Video games about time travel
Crossover video games
Video games based on The Jetsons
Internet memes introduced in 2016
Cartoon Network video games
Video games developed in Japan
Single-player video games